Racing Team Nederland is a Dutch endurance racing team founded by F1 driver and Le Mans winner Jan Lammers and businessman .

History 
, was one of the sponsors of Racing for Holland with his company (Jumbo Supermarket), owned by Lammers from 2001 onward.  During this sponsorship Frits and Jan have said: "... and since then we said it would be nice to do one day of Le Mans together".

The main sponsor for the team is the Dutch oriented supermarket concern Jumbo of which Frits is one of the owners. The colors of the team are mainly influenced by the Jumbo colors, which have been influenced by the early years (1985-1992) of the Minardi F1 Team.

2017 
The team started in the 2017 European Le Mans Series with a Dallara P217 from Day V TEC Engineering ending the season on 11th place in LMP2 with 12.5 points. During the Le Mans race that year the third driver was former F1 driver Rubens Barrichello. Jan and Rubens know each other from when Rubens tested a Formula Opel Lotus from Jan years ago. In 2017 they have finished Le Mans 13th overall (11th in the class).

2018 

One season later the team made the step to the 2018–19 FIA World Endurance Championship.

For the WEC Superseason Racing Team Nederland has added ex-Formula 1 driver Guido van der Garde as their new driver. After the 2018 race of the 24 Hours of Le Mans, Jan Lammers has stepped down as an active driver for Racing Team Nederland. Formula 2 driver Nyck de Vries has taken over the seat from Lammers for the rest of the season.

In the 2018 24 Hours of Le Mans they finished 7th in the class and 11th overall.

2019 

In 2019 24 Hours of Le Mans they have finished 15th in the class and 26th overall. They finished the 2018-2019 WEC season in 6th place.

They entered the 2019–20 FIA World Endurance Championship with a new team and a new car. They were operated by TDS Racing and entered an Oreca 07. In the first race with their new car they finished 3rd in the 2019 4 Hours of Silverstone, which was their first podium. They continued their good form in the next race with their first victory, in the 2019 6 Hours of Fuji, in what was described as 'LMP2 thriller' by media.

2022
In December 2021, Racing Team Nederland announced that they would be switching their focus to racing in North America, to take on the full Michelin Endurance Cup schedule in LMP2 as part of the 2022 IMSA SportsCar Championship.

Results

European Le Mans Series

FIA World Endurance Championship 

*Season in progress

24 Hours of Le Mans

References

External links

Dutch auto racing teams
FIA World Endurance Championship teams
European Le Mans Series teams
WeatherTech SportsCar Championship teams
24 Hours of Le Mans teams
Auto racing teams established in 2016